Argynnina is a genus of satyrid butterflies.

Species
Listed alphabetically:
Argynnina cyrila Waterhouse & Lyell, 1914
Argynnina hobartia (Westwood, 1851)

References

Satyrini
Butterfly genera
Taxa named by Arthur Gardiner Butler